Springdale Historic District is a national historic district located in New Hope, Bucks County, Pennsylvania.  The district includes 29 contributing buildings in a rural industrial area in the borough of New Hope.  Notable buildings include the Heath House / Huffnagle-Hood Mansion and grist mill, James Magill House (1790), three-story stone textile mill, Conrad Hartman Store (c. 1820), and small single-family dwellings for black and unskilled laborers.

It was added to the National Register of Historic Places in 1985.

Gallery

References

Historic districts in Bucks County, Pennsylvania
Historic districts on the National Register of Historic Places in Pennsylvania
National Register of Historic Places in Bucks County, Pennsylvania